Fifty Fathoms Deep may refer to:
 Fifty Fathoms Deep (1932 film), a French drama film
 Fifty Fathoms Deep (1931 film), an American adventure film